The Way Out is the fourth and final studio album by American musical duo The Books. It was released on July 20, 2010 by Temporary Residence Limited, and was the duo's first album to be issued by the label.

The Way Out received mostly positive reviews from critics. The album's cover is a take on that of early 1970s editions of The Way, an illustrated version of The Living Bible.

Track listing

Personnel
Credits are adapted from the album's liner notes.

The Books
 Paul de Jong – mastering, mixing, production, recording
 Nick Zammuto – mastering, mixing, production, recording

Additional personnel
 Drew Brown – additional production and engineering
 Brendon Downey – mastering, mixing

Charts

References

External links
 
 

2010 albums
The Books albums
Temporary Residence Limited albums